The Centre for China Studies (CCS), formerly the Centre for East Asian Studies (CEAS), is located in The Chinese University of Hong Kong, providing interdisciplinary undergraduate and postgraduate programs in Chinese Studies taught and examined in English for students from around the world.

History

The centre was previously known as the Centre for East Asian Studies.

Mission
Their mission is to promote scholarship on China and understanding of Chinese culture in Hong Kong and around the world.

Centre faculty
Billy Kee-long So, Director, PhD (A.N.U.), Professor of History
Ann Huss, Associate Director, PhD (Columbia), Assistant Professor of Chinese Studies
Jan Kiely, Associate Director, PhD (UC Berkeley), Associate Professor of Chinese Studies
Bei Dao, Poet, Professor of Humanities
Sui-wai Cheung, DPhil (Oxon), Assistant Professor, History
John Lagerwey, PhD (Harvard), Professor of Chinese Studies
William Shi-yuan Wang, PhD (Michigan), Wei Lun Research Professor of Chinese Linguistics and Engineering
Stan Hok-wui Wong, PhD (UCLA), Assistant Professor, Government and Public Administration
Dennis Tao Yang, PhD (Chicago), Professor, Economics

Events
CCS has been organising large-scale events:
 International Poets in Hong Kong
 International Poetry Nights 2009

References

External links
 Official website

Chinese University of Hong Kong